Tenzing-Hillary Airport , also known as Lukla Airport, is a domestic airport and altiport in the town of Lukla, in Khumbu Pasanglhamu, Solukhumbu District, Province No. 1 of Nepal. It gained worldwide fame as it was rated the most dangerous airport in the world for more than 20 years by a program titled Most Extreme Airports, broadcast on The History Channel in 2010.

The airport is popular because it is considered the starting point for treks towards Mount Everest Base Camp. There are daily flights between Lukla and Kathmandu during daylight hours in good weather. Although the flying distance is short, rain commonly occurs in Lukla while the sun is shining brightly in Kathmandu. High winds, cloud cover, and changing visibility often mean flights can be delayed or the airport closed. The airport is contained within a chain-link fence and for security is patrolled by the Nepali armed police or civil police around the clock.

History
The airport was built in 1964 under the supervision of Sir Edmund Hillary, who originally intended to build the airport on flat farmlands. However, local farmers did not want to give up their land, so the airport was built at its current position. Hillary bought the land from local Sherpas for US$2,650 and involved them in building the facilities. It has been said that Hillary was unhappy with the runway's soil resistance, and that his solution was to buy local liquor for the Sherpas and ask them to perform a foot-stomping dance to flatten the land that served as the runway. The runway was not paved until 2001.

In January 2008, the airport was renamed in honour of Sherpa Tenzing Norgay and Sir Edmund Hillary, the first people confirmed to have reached the summit of Mount Everest, and also to mark their efforts in the construction of this airport.

Facilities 

The airport's paved asphalt runway is accessible only to helicopters and small, fixed-wing, short-takeoff-and-landing aircraft such as the De Havilland Canada DHC-6 Twin Otter, Dornier 228, L-410 Turbolet and Pilatus PC-6 Turbo Porter. The runway is  ×  with an 11.7% gradient. The airport is used for passenger flights and for transporting most of the building materials and cargo to Lukla and other towns and villages to the north of Lukla, as there is no road to this region.

In the early morning, the wind is usually from the north-east, changing to a south-west wind from mid to late morning due to the action of the sun on the mountains to the north of Lukla. The airport regularly closes from mid to late morning due to the strong south-west winds that create crosswind and/or tailwinds. Consequently, flights are usually scheduled for the early morning. Sudden loss of visibility preventing planes from landing under Visual flight rules (VFR) will result in the immediate closure of the airport with no warning. Although the airport is available throughout the year, visibility problems close the airport 50% of the time during the monsoon season with a consequent cancellation of 50% of flights. Due to the terrain and the low possibility of a safe go-around for a missed approach, there are no go-around procedures for this airport.

Tenzing–Hillary Airport is frequently referred to as the most dangerous airport in the world. Arriving and departing aircraft must use a single runway (06 for landing and 24 for takeoff). There is a low prospect of a successful go-around on short final approach due to the terrain. There is high terrain immediately beyond the northern end of the runway and a steeply angled drop at the southern end of the runway into the valley below.

Due to the difficulties of successfully landing at the airport, the Civil Aviation Authority of Nepal sets high standards, according to which only experienced pilots, who have completed at least 100 short-takeoff-and-landing (STOL) missions, have over one year of STOL experience in Nepal, and have completed ten flights into Lukla with a certified instructor pilot, are allowed to land at the airport.

In October 2018 plans to expand the terminal and runway were published.
Construction of five new helipads was planned to be completed by the end of July 2021.

Airlines and destinations

Notes
 Some destinations may be affected by COVID-19, therefore temporary suspensions are not distinguished as seasonal service.

The helicopter operator Air Dynasty offers helicopter operations out of its hub at Lukla Airport.

Statistics

Passenger numbers

Accidents and incidents

 On 15 October 1973, a Royal Nepal Airlines DHC-6 Twin Otter 300 (registration 9N-ABG) was damaged beyond repair on landing. The three crew and three passengers were unhurt.
On 9 June 1991, a Nepal Airlines DHC-6 Twin Otter 300 (registration 9N-ABA) from Kathmandu crashed at the airport while attempting to land following an unstabilized approach in bad weather. The three crew and fourteen passengers escaped with injuries.
 On 26 September 1992, a Royal Air Nepal Harbin Yunshuji Y-12-II (registered 9N-ACI) faltered during takeoff and was damaged beyond repair. All twelve passengers and two crew survived.
 On 25 May 2004, while on approach to the airport, a Yeti Airlines DHC-6 Twin Otter 300 (registration 9N-AFD) from Kathmandu crashed into Lamjura Hill in heavy clouds. No passengers were on board; all three crew members were killed. The Nepalese accident investigation committee concluded that the captain provided inaccurate information about his position to the Area Control Centre.
 On 1 October 2004, on landing at the airport, a Sita Air Dornier 228 suffered a collapse of its nose gear and slid along the runway, blocking it once it had come to rest. The airport was closed for two days.
On 30 June 2005, a Gorkha Airlines Dornier 228 skidded off the runway while attempting to land. The nine passengers and three crew suffered minor injuries. The aircraft was reportedly withdrawn from service and written off after the accident.
On 8 October 2008, Yeti Airlines Flight 103, a DHC-6 Twin Otter 300 (registration 9N-AFE) crashed on final approach and caught fire, killing eighteen passengers and crew. The aircraft's captain was the only survivor. Video of the incident showed inclement weather at the time of the incident.
On 12 October 2010, a Sita Air Dornier 228 (registration 9N-AHB) lost braking control and struck the wall-end of the runway during landing. All passengers and crew escaped injury; the aircraft's nose was damaged.
On 26 September 2013, an Air Dynasty helicopter (registration 9N-AEX) crashed when the rear rotor touched the barbed wire of the compound wall at the airport. All three passengers and the captain survived.
On 27 May 2017, Summit Air Flight 409, performing a freight flight on a Let L-410 from Kathmandu to Lukla (Nepal) with three crew, was on final approach to Lukla's runway 06 at about 14:04L (08:19Z) with poor visibility when the aircraft lost altitude and touched a tree short of the runway before contacting ground about 3 metres/10 feet below the runway level. The aircraft slid down the slope before coming to a rest about 200 metres below the runway level. The captain was killed and the first officer, Shrijan Manandhar, died in hospital almost eight hours later. The third crew member received injuries and was evacuated to Kathmandu the following day after the weather had cleared.
On 14 April 2019, at 9:10 am a Summit Air Let L-410 Turbolet aircraft, registration 9N-AMH, with no passengers on board veered right and departed the runway on take-off from Lukla Airport and struck a Manang Air Eurocopter AS 350B3e helicopter registration 9N-ALC on the helipad 30 to 50 metres from the runway, destroying both the plane and the helicopter. A second helicopter, Shree Airlines Eurocopter AS 350 registered 9N-ALK, sustained little or no damage. The three reported fatalities were the co-pilot of the plane, a police officer on airport security duty who died in the crash and a second police officer who was critically injured and airlifted to Kathmandu, where he died in hospital. Among the four reported injured include the pilot of the plane and a Manang Air helicopter pilot, who were injured and flown to a hospital in Kathmandu, where they were reported to be out of danger.

Gallery

See also

 Altiport
 Syangboche Airport
 Phaplu Airport
 List of airports in Nepal

References

External links

Video of operations at the Lukla airport from YouTube
Important message Regarding Flight to Lukla

Photo of aircraft departing Lukla from Airliners.net
 "The World's Most Dangerous Airport" from forbes.com
 Landing at Lukla Airport Lukla airport article

Airports in Nepal
 
Altiports
1964 establishments in Nepal
Edmund Hillary
Tenzing Norgay